Wächtler is a surname of Germanic origin, sometimes romanized as Waechtler.

Notable persons with this name include:

 Eberhard Wächtler (1929 - 2010), German economist
 Elfriede Lohse-Wächtler (1899 - 1940), German painter
 Ferdinand Friedrich Wächtler (1692–1762), Frankish gold- and silversmith.
 Fritz Wächtler (1891 - 1945), German Nazi politician
 Fritz Wächtler (figure skater) (1891 - 1945), Austrian figure skater
 Leopold Wächtler (1896 - 1988), German painter
 Ludwig Wächtler (1842–1916), Austrian architect
 Roland Wächtler (1941 - 2009), German singer known as 

See also
 Wachtel
 Wachter
 Wächter
 Wachtler

German-language surnames